Gouania vitifolia, also known as gray Oahu chewstick, is a critically endangered flowering plant in the buckthorn family, Rhamnaceae that is endemic to Hawaii. There are less than 50 known remaining plants, many of which are believed to have perished in a 2018 wildfire.

Description 
It is a climbing shrub or woody vine with tendrils and elliptical, broadly oval leaves which have toothed margins. The leaves are covered on both sides with moderate to dense soft hairs. When in bloom, it has small white flowers.

Distribution and habitat 
Gouania vitifolia inhabits dry, coastal mesic, and mixed mesic forests on Oahu (Waianae Mountains), the Island of Hawaii (Kaū district), and west Maui. However, the only currently known populations are on O'ahu and Hawai'i, with no reported occurrences in Maui since the 1800s. It was thought to be extinct before its rediscovery in 1991.

Conservation 
In 2007 there were no more than 64 plants left on Oahu and two populations with a total "numbering in the tens" on Hawaii. A wildfire in 2018 is believed to have extinguished many of the remaining plants. Other threats include feral pigs and invasive plants.

References

vitifolia
Plants described in 1854
Endemic flora of Hawaii
Critically endangered plants